Broken English refers to certain forms of incorrect or ungrammatical use of the English language.

Broken English may also refer to:

Film
Broken English (1981 film), a 1981 film
Broken English (1996 film), a 1996 New Zealand film
Broken English (2007 film), a 2007 film

Music
 Broken English (album), a 1979 album by Marianne Faithfull
 "Broken English" (song)
 Broken English (band), a 1980s pop band
 "Broken English", a song by Adam Lambert from the album Trespassing
 "Broken English", a song by Rise Against from the album Revolutions per Minute
 Broken English (label), a part of the East West Records family of labels

English language
 Engrish bad English found in Asia
 Chinglish, bad English found in Asia
 Mute English, English as a written/read unspoken language
 Non-native pronunciations of English
 Torres Strait Creole, a creole language spoken in Australia

See also
 List of English-based pidgins
 English-based creole languages
 List of macaronic forms of English
 Bad English (disambiguation)